Ploddy the Police Car Makes a Splash (also released as Police Patrol) is a 2009 3D computer-animated adventure comedy film directed by Rasmus A. Sivertsen from a screenplay by Arthur Johansen. It is the second film to be based on the Norwegian children's character Pelle Politibil (Ploddy the Police Car), and the first to be animated. It was followed by a sequel in 2013 titled Ploddy the Police Car on the Case.

Premise 
Two brothers determined to steal the water supply of a village wreak havoc to the local environment, and it is up to the local police enforcement's Ploddy the Police Car to try and stop them.

Release 
The film had its world premiere in Oslo on Christmas Day, 2009, and was released in Norwegian cinemas on 8 January 2010, grossing $1,524,396 from 120,816 admissions for a worldwide total of $1,883,189.

References

External links 

Films directed by Rasmus A. Sivertsen
2009 films
2000s Norwegian-language films